Dorothy Lynch is a brand of salad dressing originating in the 1940s and 1960s in the American state of Nebraska, currently produced by the Tasty Toppings company. The dressing, which is also used as a dip and condiment in Nebraska, is a reddish-orange and resembles French dressing but with the addition of celery seed and other flavorings.

History
Per legend, the dressing was created by a woman of the same name, who with her husband ran a restaurant at the Legion Club in Saint Paul, Nebraska in the 1940s. As the popularity of her homemade dressing grew among patrons, they began to bring in bottles and jars from home asking them to be filled, and she decided to commercialize her creation.

The dressing was patented in 1951, and in 1964 the brand and recipe were sold to Gordon "Mac" Hull, who established the brand's factory in Columbus, Nebraska.
Dorothy Lynch's Nephew (David Lynch) was the first "delivery boy" for the business

References

External links

Salad dressings
Food and drink companies established in 1964
1964 establishments in Nebraska
Companies based in Platte County, Nebraska
Cuisine of the Midwestern United States